Pāramitā (Sanskrit, Pali: पारमिता) or pāramī (Pāli: पारमी), is a Buddhist term often translated as "perfection". It is described in Buddhist commentaries as noble character qualities generally associated with enlightened beings. Pāramī and pāramitā are both terms in Pali but Pali literature makes greater reference to pāramī, while Mahayana texts generally use the Sanskrit pāramitā.

Etymology 
Donald S. Lopez, Jr. describes the etymology of the term:

Theravāda Buddhism 
Theravada teachings on the pāramīs can be found in late canonical books and post-canonical commentaries. Theravada commentator Dhammapala describes them as noble  qualities usually associated with bodhisattas. American scholar-monk Thanissaro Bhikkhu describes them as perfections (paramī) of character necessary to achieve enlightenment as one of the three enlightened beings, a samma sambuddha a pacceka-buddha or an arahant.

Canonical sources 
In the Pāli Canon, the Buddhavaṃsa of the Khuddaka Nikāya lists the ten perfections (dasa pāramiyo) as:

 Dāna pāramī: generosity, giving of oneself
 Sīla pāramī: virtue, morality, proper conduct
 Nekkhamma pāramī: renunciation
 Paññā pāramī: wisdom, discernment
 Viriya pāramī: energy, diligence, vigour, effort
 Khanti pāramī: patience, tolerance, forbearance, acceptance, endurance
 Sacca pāramī: truthfulness, honesty
 Adhiṭṭhāna pāramī: determination, resolution
 Mettā pāramī: goodwill, friendliness, loving-kindness
 Upekkhā pāramī: equanimity, serenity

Two of the above virtues, mettā and upekkhā, also are brahmavihāras, and two – vīrya and upekkha are factors of awakening.

Historicity 
The Theravāda teachings on the pāramīs can be found in canonical books (Jataka tales, Apadāna, Buddhavaṃsa, Cariyāpiṭaka) and post-canonical commentaries written to supplement the Pāli Canon at a later time, and thus might not be an original part of the Theravāda teachings. The oldest parts of the Sutta Piṭaka (for example, Majjhima Nikāya, Digha Nikāya, Saṃyutta Nikāya and the Aṅguttara Nikāya) do not have any mention of the pāramīs as a category (though they are all mentioned individually).

Some scholars even refer to the teachings of the pāramīs as a semi-Mahāyāna teaching added to the scriptures at a later time in order to appeal to the interests and needs of the lay community and to popularize their religion. However, these views rely on the early scholarly presumption of Mahāyāna originating with religious devotion and appeal to laity. More recently, scholars have started to open up early Mahāyāna literature, which is very ascetic and expounds the ideal of the monk's life in the forest. Therefore, the practice of the pāramitās in Mahāyāna Buddhism may have been close to the ideals of the ascetic tradition of the śramaṇa.

Traditional practice 
Bhikkhu Bodhi maintains that, in the earliest Buddhist texts (which he identifies as the first four nikāyas), those seeking the extinction of suffering (nibbana) pursued the noble eightfold path.  As time went on, a backstory was provided for the multi-life development of the Buddha; as a result, the ten perfections were identified as part of the path for the bodhisattva (Pāli: bodhisatta).  Over subsequent centuries, the pāramīs were seen as being significant for aspirants to both Buddhahood and arahantship. Bhikkhu Bodhi summarizes:

Sarvāstivāda 
The Sarvāstivāda Vaibhāṣika school's main commentary, the Mahāvibhāṣā, teaches the bodhisattva path based on a system of four pāramitās: 

 generosity (dāna), 

 discipline (śīla), 

 energy (vīrya),

 wisdom (prajñā),

The Mahāvibhāṣā also mentions the system of six pāramitās, arguing that patience is classified as a kind of discipline and that meditation (Dhyāna) is to be seen as a mode of wisdom (prajñā).

Mahāyāna Buddhism 

Religious studies scholar Dale S. Wright states that Mahāyāna texts refer to the pāramitās as "bases of training" for those looking to achieve enlightenment. Wright describes the Buddhist pāramitās as a set of character ideals that guide self-cultivation and provide a concrete image of the Buddhist ideal.

The Prajñapāramitā sūtras (प्रज्ञापारमिता सूत्र), and a large number of other Mahāyāna texts list six perfections:

 Dāna pāramitā (दान पारमिता): generosity, giving of oneself (in Chinese, Korean, and Japanese, 布施波羅蜜; in Tibetan, སྦྱིན་པ sbyin-pa)
 Śīla pāramitā (शील पारमिता): virtue, morality, discipline, proper conduct (持戒波羅蜜; ཚུལ་ཁྲིམས tshul-khrims)
  pāramitā (क्षान्ति पारमिता): patience, tolerance, forbearance, acceptance, endurance (忍辱波羅蜜; བཟོད་པ bzod-pa)
 Vīrya pāramitā (वीर्य पारमिता): energy, diligence, vigour, effort (精進波羅蜜; བརྩོན་འགྲུས brtson-’grus)
 Dhyāna pāramitā (ध्यान पारमिता): one-pointed concentration, contemplation (禪定波羅蜜, བསམ་གཏན bsam-gtan)
 Prajñā pāramitā (प्रज्ञा पारमिता): wisdom, insight (般若波羅蜜; ཤེས་རབ shes-rab)

This list is also mentioned by the Theravāda commentator Dhammapala, who describes it as a categorization of the same ten perfections of Theravada Buddhism. According to Dhammapala, Sacca is classified as both Śīla and Prajñā, Mettā and Upekkhā are classified as Dhyāna, and Adhiṭṭhāna falls under all six. Bhikkhu Bodhi states that the correlations between the two sets shows there was a shared core before the Theravada and Mahayana schools split.

In the Ten Stages Sutra, four more pāramitās are listed:

7. Upāya pāramitā (उपाय पारमिता): skillful means (方便波羅蜜）
8. Praṇidhāna pāramitā (प्राणिधान पारमिता): vow, resolution, aspiration, determination (願波羅蜜）
9. Bala pāramitā (बल पारमिता): spiritual power (力波羅蜜）
10. Jñāna pāramitā (ज्ञान पारमिता): knowledge (智波羅蜜）

The Mahāratnakūṭa Sūtra  (महारत्नकूट सूत्र, the Sutra of the Heap of Jewels) also includes these additional four pāramitās with number 8 and 9 switched.

Tibetan Buddhism 
According to the perspective of Tibetan Buddhism, Mahāyāna practitioners have the choice of two practice paths: the path of perfection (Sanskrit: pāramitāyāna) or the path of tantra (Sanskrit: tantrayāna), which is the Vajrayāna.

Traleg Kyabgon Rinpoche renders "pāramitā" into English as "transcendent action" and then frames and qualifies it:

The pure illusory body is said to be endowed with the six perfections (Sanskrit: ṣatpāramitā).

The first four perfections are skillful means practice while the last two are wisdom practice. These contain all the methods and skills required for eliminating delusion and fulfilling other's needs. Also, leading from happy to happier states.

See also 
 Anupubbikathā
 Bodhipakkhiyādhammā
 Buddhist paths to liberation
 Gradual Training 
 Threefold Training
 – "Five Perfections" in Jainism

References

Citations

Works cited 
 Apte, Vaman Shivaram (1957–59). Revised and enlarged edition of Prin. V. S. Apte's The Practical Sanskrit-English Dictionary. Poona: Prasad Prakashan.
 Bodhi, Bhikkhu (1978). The All-Embracing Net of Views. Kandy: Buddhist Publication Society.
 Bodhi, Bhikkhu (ed.) (1978, 2005). A Treatise on the Paramis: From the Commentary to the Cariyapitaka A Treatise on the Paramis]: From the Commentary to the Cariyapitaka by Acariya Dhammapala (The Wheel, No. 409/411). Kandy: Buddhist Publication Society.
 Horner, I.B. (trans.) (1975; reprinted 2000). The Minor Anthologies of the Pali Canon (Part III): 'Chronicle of Buddhas' (Buddhavamsa) and 'Basket of Conduct' (Cariyapitaka).  Oxford: Pali Text Society. .
 
 Rhys Davids, T.W. & William Stede (eds.) (1921-5). The Pali Text Society’s Pali–English Dictionary. Chipstead: Pali Text Society.

External links 
Renunciation by T. Prince, a free distribution article on the Buddhist conception of renunciation
 Lama Zopa Rinpoche's view of the Six Perfections
 A Zen view of the Six Perfections
 Six paramitas, Chinese Buddhist website
 Theravada Buddhist Dhamma Talk Album: "Ten Parami (Suc 06)", By Ajahn Sucitto
What are the paramitas? Buddhism for Beginners

Buddhist philosophical concepts
Virtue